A ministry of religious affairs (sometimes with a similar name, like ministry of endowments) is a government department responsible for religious matters, including:

Current

Note:
 States of Germany Minister of Education ("Kultus", in its literal meaning) most well known for their administration of (previously Church-run) schools (and hence usually translated as ministers of education), yet remain competent for the relationships with the Churches. see also Conference of Ministers of Education
 In India, the Ministry of Minority Affairs is tasked with dealing with all kinds of minorities, including linguistic, ethnic, cultural and gender.

References

 
Religious affairs